Balázs Baji (born 9 June 1989) is a Hungarian track and field athlete who specializes in the 60 metres hurdles and 110 metres hurdles.

Career
Among his best results in 110 metres hurdles are a seventh place from the 2008 World Junior Championships, a sixth place from the 2011 Summer Universiade and a silver medal from the 2011 European U23 Championships which he achieved with a new Hungarian U23 record.

For his performances he was named the best U23 male athlete in Hungary in 2011.

In his senior career, he has won the silver medal at the 2016 European Championships and the bronze medal at the 2017 World Championships.

Competition record

Personal bests
As of 7 August 2017

Awards
Hungarian athlete of the Year (1): 2016

References

External links 
 
 
 
 
 
 

1989 births
Living people
Hungarian male hurdlers
Athletes (track and field) at the 2012 Summer Olympics
Athletes (track and field) at the 2016 Summer Olympics
Olympic athletes of Hungary
People from Békéscsaba
World Athletics Championships athletes for Hungary
European Athletics Championships medalists
World Athletics Championships medalists
Universiade medalists in athletics (track and field)
Universiade gold medalists for Hungary
Hungarian Athletics Championships winners
Medalists at the 2017 Summer Universiade
Sportspeople from Békés County
20th-century Hungarian people
21st-century Hungarian people